Yelena Sergeyevna Produnova, also known as Elena (born 15 February 1980), is a Russian former competitive gymnast. Her senior international career lasted from 1995 to 2000 and earned her multiple world and Olympic medals. She was known for her innovative and powerful skills on the vault and floor exercise. One of the most difficult vaults in women's gymnastics, the Produnova, is named after her. With a D-score of 6.4, the Produnova vault is tied with the Biles as having the highest D-score in women's vault in the 2017–2020 quadrennium.

Personal life 
Produnova was born on 15 February 1980. She lives in Rostov-on-Don, Rostov Oblast, Russia. She currently works as a gymnastics coach.

Gymnastics career

1995–96
Produnova's first major senior competition was the 1995 World Championships in Sabae, Fukui, Japan where the Russians finished fourth. Inexperienced, she made little impact on the international scene. A heel injury hampered her chances of being chosen for the 1996 Summer Olympics, and she stayed at home.

1997
At the 1997 World Championships in Lausanne, Russia took team silver behind Romania, and Produnova claimed a pair of bronzes in the all-around and floor exercise.

1998
In 1998, Produnova overcame an ankle injury. That year she also qualified 1st at the 1998 Russian Nationals and finished 5th in the all-around and 3rd on the vault. During the 1998 Cottbus event, Produnova finished 2nd on the vault, 1st on the balance beam, and 2nd on the floor. She was unable to compete at the European Championships because of her injury.

1999
At the 1999 University Games, Produnova won vault and beam titles, and also finished 2nd in the AA and first in the team competition. It was here that she debuted her handspring double front vault, since known as a Produnova. It is among the highest rated vaults in the Code of Points, and as of August 2016 only four other female gymnasts have attempted this vault in competition – Yamilet Peña from Dominican Republic, Fadwa Mahmoud from Egypt, Oksana Chusovitina from Uzbekistan and Dipa Karmakar from India.

The 1999 World Championships in Tianjin, China, Produnova finished fourth in the vault, bars, floor and all-around finals. The overall champion was Maria Olaru. Russia once again finished second to Romania.

2000
The 2000 European Championships saw Russia, with the help of Produnova, beat Romania for gold for the first time ever. Produnova also took a bronze on beam, behind teammate Svetlana Khorkina, and a silver on floor behind Ludivine Furnon of France. These results and her victory in the Russian national championships gained Produnova a place on the team for the 2000 Summer Olympics in Sydney.

In the preliminary round at the Olympics, the Russians were dominant. The quartet of Produnova, Khorkina, Yekaterina Lobaznyuk and world vault champion Elena Zamolodchikova all qualified for multiple finals. Though the Romanians were world champions, the Russians had beaten them earlier in the year.

Four of Russia's six gymnasts fell in the team final; only the two least known members of the team performed without major errors. Produnova sat down only one of two vaults and her score was dropped (at this time, teams could drop the lowest score on each apparatus therefore one fall was not too drastic). After her one error, she recorded the team's highest scores on beam and bars. The same principle applied to Khorkina's fall from bars since the score did not have to count towards the team title, the mistake did not have to cost them the gold. Both Zamolodchikova and Lobaznyuk fell on the beam, and it was not until Produnova's solid performance that the Russians showed a clean routine. The Russians were the top scoring team on floor, but it was not enough for the gold. Romania were victorious by a margin of only two tenths. Produnova and Khorkina both removed their silver medals as they walked off the podium.

Produnova had qualified for the all-around finals, where she was a legitimate medal threat. However, she had broken her foot during the Olympics and had to withdraw. Teammate Elena Zamolodchikova took her place. Two of the three Russians fell, and none managed to make the podium.

Produnova competed in both of the finals to which she had qualified, bars and beam. A mistake kept her out of the medals on bars. She hit her beam routine solidly and stuck her difficult double front dismount, winning a bronze medal, behind Liu Xuan of China and Lobaznyuk.

Sydney was Produnova's last major competition.

Eponymous skills
Produnova currently has two eponymous skills listed in the Code of Points.

Floor music
Produnova's floor exercise music at the 2000 Summer Olympics was "The Ride" from James Horner's The Mask of Zorro soundtrack. "The Ride" is the third track of the soundtrack CD, before and after two songs with "Elena" in their names.

Competitive history

See also 

 List of Olympic female gymnasts for Russia

References

External links

Elena Produnova at Gymn Forum

Produnova (vault animation)

1980 births
Living people
Russian female artistic gymnasts
Gymnasts at the 2000 Summer Olympics
Olympic gymnasts of Russia
Olympic silver medalists for Russia
Olympic bronze medalists for Russia
Olympic medalists in gymnastics
Medalists at the World Artistic Gymnastics Championships
Sportspeople from Rostov-on-Don
Originators of elements in artistic gymnastics
Universiade medalists in gymnastics
Universiade gold medalists for Russia
Universiade silver medalists for Russia
Medalists at the 2000 Summer Olympics
European champions in gymnastics
21st-century Russian women